Edgar Steven Davids (born 13 March 1973) is a Dutch former professional footballer and current coach.

After beginning his career with Ajax, winning several domestic and international titles, he subsequently played in Italy for AC Milan, and later enjoyed a successful spell with Juventus, before being loaned out to Barcelona in 2004. He went on to play for Inter Milan and Tottenham Hotspur before returning to Ajax. Having struggled with injuries for two years, Davids returned to competitive football during a brief spell with Crystal Palace before retiring at the age of 37. In 2012, he was appointed player-manager at the English League Two club Barnet. He resigned by mutual agreement as manager in January 2014. He was capped 74 times by the Netherlands at international level, scoring six goals, and represented his country at the FIFA World Cup (once) and the UEFA European Championship (three times).

One of the greatest and most recognisable players of his generation, Davids often stood out on the football field due to his dreadlocked hair and the protective goggles he wore due to glaucoma. A combative and energetic, yet creative and skilful midfielder, Davids was nicknamed "The Pitbull" by Louis van Gaal because of his marking ability, aggression, and hard tackling style of play. In 2004, he was one of the players chosen by Pelé to feature in the FIFA 100, his list of the world's greatest living footballers.

Early life
Davids was born in Suriname and is of Afro-Surinamese and Jewish  from his mother. The family moved to the Netherlands when Davids was an infant. His cousin Lorenzo is also a footballer.

Club career

Ajax
After being rejected on two previous occasions by the club, Davids started his career at the age of 12 with Ajax. He made his first team debut on 6 September 1991 in a 5–1 home win over RKC Waalwijk. He helped the Amsterdam club to three domestic Eredivisie titles, as well as continental success with the 1992 UEFA Cup and the 1995 UEFA Champions League. In the 1996 UEFA Champions League final, he missed Ajax's first penalty in the shoot-out, which they ultimately lost to Juventus. While at Ajax, Davids was nicknamed "The Pitbull" by Ajax manager Louis van Gaal due to his fierce style of play in the team's midfield.

Milan and Juventus

At the start of the 1996–97 season, Davids moved to Italy to play for Milan on a free transfer alongside team-mate Michael Reiziger, both early beneficiaries of the "Bosman ruling". In an unsuccessful season in which defending champions Milan changed their manager twice and finished 11th in Serie A, Davids broke his leg in a 1–0 defeat at Perugia on 23 February 1997. After failing to recover his place in the team he was allowed to join league rivals Juventus in December 1997 for a reduced 9 billion Italian lire (£3 million) transfer fee.

At Juventus he soon became a permanent first team member in the midfield, usually playing on the left flank or in the centre, as a defensive midfielder, forming a notable midfield partnership alongside French playmaker Zinedine Zidane. Six successful years in Turin followed, with Davids helping the side to the Serie A title in 1998, 2002 and 2003, as well as two Supercoppa Italiana and the UEFA Intertoto Cup. Juventus manager Marcello Lippi once described him as "my one-man engine room".

Davids was often inspirational in Europe, playing 15 times as the club made it all the way to the 2002–03 Champions League final before losing to Milan on penalties. He had also previously managed to reach the Champions League final with Juventus in 1998, followed by a semi-final finish during the 1998–99 season, as well as reaching the 2002 Coppa Italia Final.

Barcelona (loan)
Davids joined Barcelona on loan in January 2004 from Juventus. Joining midway through a season where the club was struggling in mid-table and recently appointed manager Frank Rijkaard was under considerable pressure, Davids led Barça's successful resurgence of form which saw them finishing second to Valencia in La Liga. Davids' arrival has been cited as the catalyst for the Catalan club's dominance of Spanish and European football during the mid-to-late 2000s (decade), with Barcelona winning La Liga the following season (after five years without winning the league title) and a La Liga and Champions League double in 2005–06.

Inter Milan and Tottenham Hotspur
In the summer of 2004, Davids permanently moved on to Italian club Inter Milan on a three-year contract. When Inter terminated the remaining years of his contract in August 2005, he moved to England on a free transfer to play for Tottenham Hotspur. He had a successful stay at Tottenham and instantly became a fan favourite. His first and only goal was in a 2–1 away win against Wigan Athletic. Davids played for Spurs in the 2005–06 and the 2006–07 seasons, with the club finishing fifth in both seasons.

Return to Ajax

Davids signed once more for Ajax on 28 January 2007 and played his first match against club rivals Feyenoord on 4 February. After the mid-season switch, Davids proved his value for the Ajax team again. He was one of the key midfielders in the run for the Dutch championship that was lost on one single goal to PSV on the final day of the league. He also played a major role in Ajax's cup campaign. He secured the KNVB Cup for Ajax by scoring the final penalty in a thrilling penalty shoot-out against AZ. Prior to the start of the 2007–08 season, Davids' leg was broken in a pre-season friendly against Go Ahead Eagles, sidelining him for around three months. In May 2008, Davids said he would leave Ajax when his contract expired on 30 June.

Davids played against the LA Galaxy on 6 December 2008 in an exhibition match held at Mount Smart Stadium in Auckland, New Zealand, as part of an Oceania XI All-Star team, despite the fact he is not from Oceania and has never played for an Oceanic club or national team. Davids was in contract negotiations with English Championship club Leicester City from 22 October 2009, however he failed to make a decision for over a week and the club withdrew their offer on 30 October.

Crystal Palace
On 20 August 2010, Davids agreed a pay-as-you-play deal with English Championship club Crystal Palace. He made his debut on 24 August 2010 at left-back in the Second Round of the League Cup against Portsmouth. On 8 November 2010, he announced his departure from the club, stating it was "one of the greatest experiences of my life".

International career

Davids made his debut for the Netherlands national team on 20 April 1994 in Tilburg, in a 1–0 defeat to the Republic of Ireland. He quickly became an integral part of the squad for the next decade, though he failed to win any major tournaments for the Oranje.

During UEFA Euro 1996, he was sent home by then manager Guus Hiddink for saying in a radio interview, "Hiddink should stop putting his head in some players' asses."

Nonetheless, Davids remained appreciated by Hiddink, who included him in the Dutch squad for the 1998 FIFA World Cup in France. Davids' most notable performance for the national team came in the second round match against FR Yugoslavia. He scored the winning goal in the last minute of the game and ensured that the Dutch team went through to the next round to meet Argentina. The Netherlands eventually finished fourth overall and Davids was named to the official FIFA "Team of the Tournament".

In 1999, Davids began wearing protective glasses following surgery in his right eye caused by glaucoma, which developed in 1995 following eye injuries. Davids first wore them on 4 September 1999 in a friendly match against Belgium. On 17 May 2001, Davids was suspended by FIFA when he tested positive for the banned anabolic steroid, nandrolone.

Davids played in Euro 2000, where the Netherlands reached the semi-finals before losing to Italy via penalty shootout. Davids was again named as part of the "Team of the Tournament".

During the Netherlands' Euro 2004 qualifying matches, Davids scored the Netherlands' first qualifying goal in their opening 3–0 victory against Belarus, and subsequently played in five of the remaining seven Group 3 fixtures and both legs of the play-off victory against Scotland.

After Euro 2004, new national team coach Marco van Basten appointed Davids as captain of the team. However, lack of first team football at his club Inter meant Davids lost his place in the national team in October 2004, thus losing the captain's armband in the process, which was later handed to goalkeeper Edwin van der Sar. In October 2005, during the latter stages of qualifying for the 2006 World Cup, Davids was recalled to the national team, though not as captain. He fell out of the picture again shortly after, thereby missing out on the Dutch squad for the World Cup.

Style of play
A quick, hard-working, tenacious team player, gifted with power and pace, as well as exceptional physical strength and stamina in spite of his diminutive stature. Davids was renowned for his dynamic and combative style of play, tight marking of opponents, and ability to break down opposition plays as a defensive midfielder. In addition to his ball-winning ability, as well as his physical and athletic attributes, Davids was also a highly talented and creative player, who was known for his outstanding technique, vision, acceleration, close control, quick footwork, and ball-juggling skills; his technical ability and prowess at street soccer and as a freestyle footballer earned him the nickname "The Mayor of the Street" in his youth. Davids was also a powerful striker of the ball, as well as being an accurate passer and crosser with his excellent left foot, which enabled him to create chances for teammates after winning back possession. His tactical intelligence, awareness, and ability to read the game, combined with his speed, energy, tackling, vision, and dribbling ability, allowed him to start counter-attacks after winning back possession and also enabled him to carry the ball forward, make attacking runs, and contribute to his team's offensive play by linking up the defence and the attack effectively. His versatility and wide range of skills thus enabled him to be deployed in several other midfield positions throughout his career; he was capable of playing as a left midfielder, or as a central or box-to-box midfielder, or even as a left back, and in his youth, was also deployed as an attacking midfielder, or as a second striker on occasion. Regarded as one of the greatest midfielders of his generation, although he received acclaim for his playing ability and leadership as a footballer, Davids also gained a degree of infamy due to his strong character, temper, and outspokenness, which often led him to be involved in conflicts with his managers; he also struggled with injuries throughout his career. Due to his aggressive and hard-tackling playing style, Davids earned several nicknames throughout his career, such as "The Piranha", "Tubarão" (The Shark), and most notably, "The Pitbull".

Media
Davids has appeared in commercials for the American sportswear company Nike. In 1996, he starred in a Nike commercial titled "Good vs Evil" in a gladiatorial game set in a Roman amphitheatre. Appearing alongside football players from around the world, including Ronaldo, Paolo Maldini, Eric Cantona, Patrick Kluivert and Jorge Campos, they defend "the beautiful game" against a team of demonic warriors, before it culminates with Cantona striking the ball and destroying evil.

In a global Nike advertising campaign in the run-up to the 2002 World Cup in Korea and Japan, Davids starred in a "Secret Tournament" commercial (branded by Nike as "Scorpion KO") directed by Terry Gilliam, appearing alongside football players such as Thierry Henry, Ronaldinho, Francesco Totti, Luís Figo and Japanese star Hidetoshi Nakata, with former player Eric Cantona the tournament "referee".

Davids features in EA Sports' FIFA video game series, and was selected to appear on the cover of FIFA Football 2003 alongside Manchester United winger Ryan Giggs and Brazilian international Roberto Carlos. The online game League of Legends by Riot Games used Davids' likeness for a character skin called Striker Lucian without permission. Davids sued, and Dutch courts ruled that Riot Games must compensate Davids a percentage of their earnings from the skin.

Coaching career

Ajax
In June 2011, Davids was elected to the new supervisory board at Ajax alongside Johan Cruyff.

Barnet

Since 2010, Davids had been living in North London with his partner and had been participating in street football as well as managing Sunday league amateur side Brixton United. On 11 October 2012, Davids joined League Two side Barnet in a player-manager role, alongside Mark Robson. The next day, on his managerial debut, Barnet lost 4–1 at Underhill to Plymouth Argyle, with Davids leaving himself out of the squad. They followed this up with a 4–0 home win over Northampton Town where Davids played the full match, captaining the team and being voted Man of the Match. In November, he started against Morecambe which Barnet lost 4–1. Near the end of December 2012, following the departure of Robson, Davids took charge of the club by himself. Davids scored his first goal for Barnet in February 2013 in a 2–0 home victory over Southend United.

In March 2013, on the return journey from a defeat at Accrington Stanley, Davids sent the Barnet team coach back to pick up 36 supporters whose coach had broken down on the motorway and take them to the next service station.

Despite initially guiding Barnet off the foot of League Two, and lifting them out of the relegation zone, Barnet dropped back into the bottom two on the final day of the 2012–13 season, following a defeat to Northampton Town, and were relegated out of the Football League at the expense of AFC Wimbledon who were able to escape by beating Fleetwood Town. On 21 May 2013, it was announced that Davids would remain in charge of Barnet for the club's 2013–14 Conference Premier season. In July 2013, Davids announced his decision to wear the number 1 shirt for the 2013–14 season, a shirt number traditionally worn by goalkeepers, saying that he intended to "set a trend" of midfielders wearing the number 1 shirt.

Discipline was a major problem for Davids in the 2013–14 season. He was booked in each of the first eight league games he played, and sent off in three of them. There was also controversy when it emerged that he would not attend away games that required an overnight stay, leaving assistant manager Ulrich Landvreugd to take charge. In December 2013, Davids considered retiring from football after being sent off for the third time in the season in Barnet's 2–1 defeat by Salisbury City.

Davids resigned from his post as manager on 18 January 2014.

In June 2014, Southern Counties East Football League side Greenwich Borough announced they were "in advanced talks" with Davids, with chairman Perry Skinner stating that he was "70% sure he'll come on board". The following month it was announced the club's attempt to sign Davids had been unsuccessful.

Telstar
In 2020, Davids was appointed assistant coach of Dutch Eerste Divisie club Telstar.

Olhanense 
On January 4, 2021, Davids was announced as the head coach of Portuguese side, S.C. Olhanense. He was sacked on 19 July 2021.

Personal life
Davids was engaged to fashion designer Olcay Gulsen. In 1999, Davids started his own Street Soccer brand called Monta Street.

Davids won a lawsuit filed in a Dutch court against League of Legends developer Riot Games for using his likeness in an in-game association football-themed skin for the champion Lucian without his permission.

Career statistics

Club

International

Scores and results list the Netherlands goal tally first, score column indicates score after each Davids goal.

Managerial statistics

Honours

Ajax
Eredivisie: 1993–94, 1994–95, 1995–96
KNVB Cup: 1992–93, 2006–07
Johan Cruyff Shield: 1995
UEFA Champions League: 1994–95
UEFA Cup: 1991–92
UEFA Super Cup: 1995
Intercontinental Cup: 1995

Juventus
Serie A: 1997–98, 2001–02, 2002–03
Supercoppa Italiana: 2003

Inter Milan
Coppa Italia: 2004–05

Netherlands
FIFA World Cup fourth place: 1998

Individual
UEFA European Championship Team of the Tournament: 2000
FIFA World Cup All-Star Team: 1998
FIFA 100

See also
List of select Jewish football (association; soccer) players

References

External links

 
 
 
  
 
 
 Profile at www.voetbalstats.nl
 Edgar Davids his fashion label Monta Street Soccer

1973 births
Living people
Sportspeople from Paramaribo
Association football midfielders
Dutch footballers
Netherlands under-21 international footballers
Netherlands international footballers
Surinamese emigrants to the Netherlands
Surinamese people of Jewish descent
UEFA Euro 1996 players
1998 FIFA World Cup players
UEFA Euro 2000 players
UEFA Euro 2004 players
FIFA 100
UEFA Champions League winning players
UEFA Cup winning players
AFC Ajax players
A.C. Milan players
Juventus F.C. players
FC Barcelona players
Inter Milan players
Tottenham Hotspur F.C. players
Crystal Palace F.C. players
Barnet F.C. players
Dutch expatriate footballers
Expatriate footballers in Italy
Expatriate footballers in England
Expatriate footballers in Spain
La Liga players
Serie A players
Eredivisie players
Premier League players
English Football League players
National League (English football) players
Doping cases in association football
Dutch sportspeople in doping cases
Dutch football managers
Dutch expatriate football managers
Barnet F.C. managers
S.C. Olhanense managers
Expatriate football managers in England
Dutch expatriate sportspeople in Italy
Dutch expatriate sportspeople in Spain
Dutch expatriate sportspeople in England
English Football League managers
National League (English football) managers
Association football player-managers
SC Telstar non-playing staff